Alistair B. Lawrence (born 1954) is an ethologist.  He currently holds a joint chair in animal behaviour and welfare at Scotland's Rural College and the University of Edinburgh.

Education
Lawrence graduated from the University of St Andrews with a degree in zoology.  He then studied for his PhD at the University of Edinburgh under the direction of David Wood-Gush.

Career
In 1995 he received the RSPCA/BSAS award for innovative developments in animal welfare for his 'outstanding contribution to animal welfare research'.

He has published extensively throughout his career.
 
Lawrence is a past secretary of the International Society for Applied Ethology and is a supporter of Compassion in World Farming.  He has served on the UK Farm Animal Welfare Committee and has been appointed to the council of the Universities Federation for Animal Welfare.

With Aubrey Manning he oversees the David Wood-Gush Trust Fund that set up and supports the annual Wood-Gush lecture.

References

External links
Scotland's Rural College homepage
University of Edinburgh homepage

1954 births
20th-century scientists
21st-century scientists
Academics of the University of Edinburgh
Alumni of the University of St Andrews
Alumni of the University of Edinburgh
Ethologists
Living people
People educated at Strathallan School
People from Perthshire
Scottish animal welfare scholars